Chongqing Jiaotong University station (Chinese: 重庆交通大学站), formerly known as Ertang station (Chinese: 二塘站), is a station on Line 3 of Chongqing Rail Transit in Chongqing Municipality, China. It is located in Nan'an District. It opened in 2011.

Station structure

References

Railway stations in Chongqing
Railway stations in China opened in 2011
Chongqing Rail Transit stations
Railway stations in China at university and college campuses